Julissa Diez (born 5 June 1989) is a Peruvian taekwondo athlete.

She represented Peru at the 2016 Summer Olympics in Rio de Janeiro, in the women's 49 kg.

References

1989 births
Living people
Peruvian female taekwondo practitioners
Olympic taekwondo practitioners of Peru
Taekwondo practitioners at the 2016 Summer Olympics
Taekwondo practitioners at the 2015 Pan American Games
Taekwondo practitioners at the 2019 Pan American Games
Pan American Games competitors for Peru
Pan American Games medalists in taekwondo
Pan American Games silver medalists for Peru
Taekwondo practitioners at the 2011 Pan American Games
Medalists at the 2011 Pan American Games
21st-century Peruvian women